Richard Lee Fouts (August 7, 1933 – August 5, 2003) was an American professional Canadian football player with the Canadian Football League's Toronto Argonauts and the BC Lions.  After playing college football at the University of Missouri, where he was an All-American, Fouts spent his entire 13-year CFL career as a defensive lineman. He was named CFL All-Star three times in 1963, 1964 and 1965, and was a part of the Lions' Grey Cup victory in 1964.

1933 births
2003 deaths
American players of Canadian football
BC Lions players
Canadian football defensive linemen
Missouri Tigers football players
Sportspeople from Omaha, Nebraska
Players of American football from Nebraska
Toronto Argonauts players